Avoncliff railway station serves the hamlet of Avoncliff in Wiltshire, England, together with the nearby villages of Westwood and Winsley, and Turleigh hamlet. It is next to the Kennet and Avon Canal and almost adjacent to the Avoncliff Aqueduct, so it is popular with walkers and cyclists who wish to travel along the canal path or the picturesque walks around the station.

The station has two platforms, each long enough for  coaches, with a waiting shelter and original lamp-posts, and is served by Great Western Railway. Residents have voluntarily decorated the station with pots of flowers and, to mark its 100-year anniversary on 9 July 2006, decorated the station with bunting and dressed in Victorian clothing for the celebrations.

History
Opened on the Wessex Main Line by the Great Western Railway as Avoncliff Halt on 9 July 1906, it remained part of that company during the Grouping of 1923. The station then passed to the Western Region of British Railways on nationalisation in 1948. The suffix 'Halt' was dropped from 5 May 1969.

When sectorisation was introduced in the 1980s, the station was served by Regional Railways until the privatisation of British Railways. The station was a request stop until July 2010, when all stops became mandatory.

Services
A generally hourly service is provided by Great Western Railway, northbound to Bath and Bristol and southbound to Bradford on Avon, Trowbridge and Westbury, with some trains continuing to Weymouth and Southampton. The service is less frequent on Sundays.

Other GWR services pass through the station but do not stop.

Gallery

References

Bibliography

External links

 Station on navigable O.S. map

Railway stations in Wiltshire
Former Great Western Railway stations
Railway stations in Great Britain opened in 1906
Railway stations served by Great Western Railway
DfT Category F2 stations